An Xuyên may refer to:

 An Xuyên Bakery, a bakery in Portland, Oregon, United States
 An Xuyên province, a former province of South Vietnam